Amur Arsenovich Kalmykov (born 29 May 1994) is a Russian football player. He plays for FC Rodina Moscow.

Club career
He made his debut in the Russian Professional Football League for FC Afips Afipsky on 2 September 2017 in a game against FC Kuban-2 Krasnodar.

On 30 December 2017, he signed a 3-year contract with FC Anzhi Makhachkala. He made his Russian Premier League debut for Anzhi on 2 March 2018 in a game against FC Rubin Kazan. He joined FC Urozhay Krasnodar on loan for the 2018–19 season on 26 July 2018.

On 10 June 2019, he signed with FC Armavir.

On 7 July 2020, he signed a contract with Russian Premier League club FC Tambov until the end of the 2019–20 season, with an option to extend it for additional 2 years.

On 12 August 2020, he signed a three-year contract with FC Torpedo Moscow. On 2 September 2022, Kalmykov was released by Torpedo.

Career statistics

Notes

Honours

Individual
 Russian Professional Football League Zone South best player, top scorer (17 goals) (2018–19).

References

External links
 
 Profile by Russian Professional Football League
 Profile by Football National League

1994 births
Sportspeople from Kabardino-Balkaria
Living people
Russian footballers
Association football forwards
FC Kuban Krasnodar players
FC Anzhi Makhachkala players
FC Urozhay Krasnodar players
FC Armavir players
FC Tambov players
FC Torpedo Moscow players
Russian Second League players
Russian Premier League players
Russian First League players